Keith Sarasin is a chef from New Hampshire in the United States who has written four books.

Career 
In 2012, Sarasin started The Farmers Dinner.

Sarasin's four books are The Perfect Turkey, The Farmers Dinner Cookbook, Meat: The Ultimate Cookbook and Jerky: The Essential Cookbook.

References

External links 
 Official website

American male chefs
Year of birth missing (living people)
Living people
Place of birth missing (living people)
American restaurateurs
Cookbook writers